In music, a villanella (plural villanelle) is a form of light Italian secular vocal music which originated in Italy just before the middle of the 16th century.  It first appeared in Naples, and influenced the later canzonetta, and from there also influenced the madrigal.

The subject matter is generally rustic, comic, and often satirical; frequently the mannerisms of art music, such as the madrigal, are a subject of parody.  The rhyme scheme of the verse in the earlier Neapolitan forms of the villanelle is usually abR abR abR ccR.  The villanelle became one of the most popular forms of song in Italy around mid-century.

The music of the early villanella (known as the canzone villanesca) is invariably for three unaccompanied voices.  The first composers of villanelle were the Neapolitans Giovanni Domenico da Nola and Giovan Tomaso di Maio; later composers, no longer from Naples, included Adrian Willaert, Luca Marenzio, Adriano Banchieri, Orlande de Lassus, and others.

References 
 Denis Arnold, "Vilanella", The New Grove Dictionary of Music and Musicians, first edition, edited by Stanley Sadie (London: Macmillan Publishers, 1980): 19:770–773.
 Gustave Reese, Music in the Renaissance (New York, W.W. Norton & Co., 1954). 
  The New Harvard Dictionary of Music, edited by Don Randel (Cambridge, Massachusetts: Harvard University Press, 1986). 
 Donna G. Cardamone, The Canzone Villanesca alla Napolitane and Related Forms, 1537-1570 (Ann Arbor: UMI Research Press, 1981). .
 Donna G. Cardamone, "The Debut of the Canzone Villanesca alla Napolitana". Studi Musicali 4 (1975): 65–75.
 Donna G. Cardamone, "'Madrigali a Tre et Arie Napolitane' – A Typographical and Repertorial Study". Journal of the American Musicological Society 35, no. 3 (1982): 436–481.
 Concetta Assenza, La canzonetta dal 1570 al 1615 (Lucca: LIM, 1997). .

Renaissance music
Baroque music
Italian music history
Classical music styles